Denis Stamper Lawson (born 27 September 1947) is a Scottish actor and director. He is known for his roles as John Jarndyce in the BBC's adaptation of Bleak House, as Gordon Urquhart in the film Local Hero, as Retired DI Steve McAndrew in BBC One's New Tricks, as Kit Curran in The Kit Curran Radio Show, and as Wedge Antilles in the original Star Wars trilogy, later reprising the role in Star Wars: The Rise of Skywalker in 2019.

Early life
Lawson was born in Glasgow but grew up in Crieff, Perthshire, after his family moved there when he was three years old. He is the son of Phyllis Neno (née Stamper), a merchant, and Laurence Lawson, a watchmaker. Lawson was educated at Crieff Primary School (then called Crieff Public School). After the 11-plus examination, he attended Morrison's Academy as a day pupil before attending the Royal Scottish Academy of Music and Drama, having first unsuccessfully auditioned for the Royal Academy of Dramatic Art in London. He then sold carpets and did amateur theatre work for a year in Dundee before auditioning again at RADA in London and successfully at RSAMD in Glasgow.

Career
Lawson began his acting career with a small role in a 1969 stage production of The Metamorphosis in London's West End. and has since starred in television dramas such as The Merchant of Venice (1973) opposite Laurence Olivier as Shylock, Rock Follies (1976) and Dead Head (1986).

Lawson played X-wing pilot Wedge Antilles in all three films of the original Star Wars trilogy. In 2001, he reprised the role, in voiceover form, for the Nintendo GameCube game Star Wars Rogue Squadron II: Rogue Leader.

He has appeared often on the West End stage, notably in the musical Mr. Cinders at the Fortune Theatre from 1983 to 1984.

In 1999, Lawson directed a production of Little Malcolm & His Struggle Against the Eunuchs which was first staged at the Hampstead Theatre before transferring to the Comedy Theatre in London's West End starring his nephew Ewan McGregor in the lead role of Malcolm Scrawdyke.

He appeared on an episode of Loose Ends hosted by Ned Sherrin on BBC Radio 4 on 10 December 2005.

In 2005, he played the leading role of John Jarndyce in the critically acclaimed BBC adaptation of Charles Dickens' Bleak House, receiving an Emmy nomination. Two years later he played Peter Syme in the BBC One drama serial Jekyll, a modern version of The Strange Case of Dr Jekyll and Mr Hyde. Lawson also appeared as Captain "Dreadnought" Foster in ITV's dramatisations of C.S. Forester's Hornblower. He appeared in Robin Hood in which he played the Harold of Winchester.

He also appeared in the West End playing the character of Georges in the revival of the musical hit La Cage Aux Folles. No stranger to musical theatre, Lawson previously starred in the London revival of Pal Joey.

He starred as the lead in Above Their Station, a sitcom for the BBC written by Rhys Thomas about Community Support Officers; it was made as a pilot but never commissioned, being shown only as a one-off special. Lawson appeared alongside actress Helena Bonham Carter in the BBC Four movie based on the life of Enid Blyton, playing Kenneth Darrell Waters, a London surgeon who becomes Blyton's second husband. In July 2009 Lawson appeared as Alexander Fleming in a BBC Four drama called Breaking the Mould: The Story of Penicillin alongside Dominic West. Lawson played the part of Alice's grandfather in ITV1's supernatural crime thriller Marchlands which was shown in February 2011.

Lawson appeared at the Royal Court Theatre once more in The Acid Test by Anya Reiss in 2011.

Lawson replaced James Bolam in the BBC One series New Tricks in its ninth series in 2012.

Lawson has said he was asked to reprise his role as Wedge Antilles in Star Wars: The Force Awakens, but reportedly turned down the role because he believed it would have "bored" him. However, Lawson later said he actually declined to appear in The Force Awakens due to a scheduling conflict, and would have appeared in the film had he been available. Lawson returned to the role in 2019's Star Wars: The Rise of Skywalker.

Personal life
In 1973, he met actress Diane Fletcher in a stage production of Twelfth Night. They have a son together, Jamie (born 1979).

He met his wife, actress Sheila Gish, on the set of the 1985 film That Uncertain Feeling. They lived together for nearly 20 years before marrying in March 2004 in Antigua; she died of cancer a year later.

In 2017, he married Karen Prentice in Italy.

His nephew is actor Ewan McGregor.

Filmography

Film

Television

Theatre

Video games

References

External links

1947 births
Living people
People educated at Morrison's Academy
Scottish male television actors
Scottish male film actors
People from Crieff
Laurence Olivier Award winners
Alumni of the Royal Conservatoire of Scotland